The Master of Staffolo (active 1420–1460) was an anonymous late-Gothic style painter active in the region of Marche and Umbria.

He appears to have been influenced by Gentile da Fabriano, the brothers Salimbeni of San Severino Marche, and Bartolomeo di Tommaso of Foligno.

Attributed to this painter are many works including:
Painting for Sant'Egidio, Staffolo
Painting for Convent of the Beata Mattia in Matelica
Painting at Museo nazionale di Palazzo Venezia, Rome 
Painting for Sacro Convento, Museo del Tesoro, Assisi
Painting at Galleria Rob Smeets, Milan
 Four half-figures in fresco: Saints Mary Magdalen, John the Baptist, Venanzio, andAnthony of Padua, for Fabriano Cathedral
 San Bernardino da Siena, San Giovanni da Capestrano and two St Sebastians, Palazzo Vescovile, Fabriano
 Madonna and Child with San Bernardino da Siena, Oratory of Santa Maria del Buon Gesù, Fabriano
Frescoes in the lunettes and lateral niches in the entrance portal of the Pinacoteca Civica, Fabriano
 Madonna di Loreto, atrium of Palazzo Baravelli in piazza Miliani
 Triptych Enthroned Madonna and Child with Saints Venanzio, Mariano, and Albacina, Parish church of Fabriano
 Pietà and St Giacomo della Marca, St Bernardino da Siena; Sant'Onofrio, Fabriano
 Virgin adoring Child, l'Eterno, with St John the Baptist and Catherine of Alexandria, Pinacoteca Civica di Fabriano

References

15th-century Italian painters
Staffolo
Gothic painters